Kaleidoscope Heart Tour was a concert tour by American singer-songwriter Sara Bareilles, in support of her second studio album, Kaleidoscope Heart.

There were three legs of the tour: the first was from September to December 2010, the second was in April and May 2011, and the third was from July to December 2011. Though the tour was predominantly in the United States, Bareilles also performed in Canada, Singapore, South Korea, Japan, and Indonesia.

Support acts
Leg 1

Greg Laswell (9/25 – 10/18)
Javier Dunn (9/25 – 10/4)
Cary Brothers (11/2 – 11/24)
Holly Conlan (10/7 – 11/24)

Augustana (11/13)
Raining Jane (12/16)
Joey Ryan (12/17 – 12/18)
Kenneth Pattengale (12/17 – 12/18)

Leg 2
Elizabeth & the Catapult
Ximena Sariñana
Javier Dunn

Leg 3

Joshua Radin (7/19)
Raining Jane (7/19)
Javier Dunn

Ben Lee (10/11 – 10/17)
Elizabeth & the Catapult(10/10 – 10/17)
Joshua Radin

Setlist

Additional notes
Since the show on October 18, Bareilles performed "Machine Gun" after "Gonna Get Over You".
At certain concerts, Bareilles performed Cee Lo Green's "Fuck You" before "Gonna Get Over You".
At certain concerts, Bareilles performed Beyoncé's "Single Ladies (Put a Ring on It)" before "Gonna Get Over You".

Tour dates

Cancellations and rescheduled shows

References

Sara Bareilles concert tours
2010 concert tours
2011 concert tours